Étude Op. 10, No. 9, in F minor, is a technical study composed by Frédéric Chopin in 1829. This étude is part of the twelve studies which belong to Op. 10. It is widely regarded as a good left hand étude because it promotes flexibility in the wrists and fingers.

External links 
 Analysis of Chopin Études at ourchopin.com
 
 Op. 10, No. 9 played by Alfred Cortot
 Op. 10, No. 9 played by Claudio Arrau
 Op. 10, No. 9 played by Vladimir Ashkenazy
 Op. 10, No. 9 played by Maurizio Pollini

10 09
1830 compositions
Compositions in F minor